IROC XXVIII was the 28th season of the Crown Royal International Race of Champions, which began on Friday, February 13, 2004 at Daytona International Speedway. The all-star roster included twelve drivers from five premier racing series. Matt Kenseth won the championship, finishing third in the first race, last in the second race, and first in the final two races.  

The roster of drivers and final points standings were as follows:



Race One (Daytona International Speedway)
12- Ryan Newman
97- Kurt Busch
17- Matt Kenseth
48- Jimmie Johnson
11- Steve Kinser
03- Hélio Castroneves
29- Kevin Harvick
1- Scott Dixon
8- Scott Sharp
24- Travis Kvapil
80- J. J. Yeley
20- Danny Lasoski

Race Two (Texas Motor Speedway)
20- Danny Lasoski
29- Kevin Harvick
48- Jimmie Johnson
12- Ryan Newman
24- Travis Kvapil
8- Scott Sharp
03- Hélio Castroneves
11- Steve Kinser
1- Scott Dixon
80- J. J. Yeley
97- Kurt Busch
17-Matt Kenseth

Race Three (Richmond International Raceway)
17- Matt Kenseth
12- Ryan Newman
97- Kurt Busch
48- Jimmie Johnson
29- Kevin Harvick
8- Scott Sharp
80- J. J. Yeley
03- Hélio Castroneves
1- Scott Dixon
20- Danny Lasoski
24- Travis Kvapil
11- Steve Kinser

Race Four (Atlanta Motor Speedway)
17- Matt Kenseth
12- Ryan Newman
20- Danny Lasoski
97- Kurt Busch
24- Travis Kvapil
48- Jimmie Johnson
29- Kevin Harvick
1- Scott Dixon
11- Steve Kinser
8- Scott Sharp
03- Hélio Castroneves
80- J. J. Yeley

References

International Race of Champions
2004 in American motorsport